Mr. Irrelevant is the nickname given to the last pick of the annual National Football League Draft. Although NFL drafts date back to 1936, the first person to be called Mr. Irrelevant was Kelvin Kirk of the 1976 NFL Draft.

History
"Mr. Irrelevant" and "Irrelevant Week" began in 1976 when former USC and NFL receiver Paul Salata founded the event in Newport Beach, California. He announced the final pick of each NFL Draft until 2013; from 2014 his daughter took over in announcing the pick. After each draft, the new Mr. Irrelevant and his family are invited to spend a week during the summer in Newport Beach.  A trip to Disneyland, a golf tournament, a regatta, a roast giving advice to the new draftee, and a ceremony awarding him the Lowsman Trophy are included. The trophy mimics the Heisman Trophy but depicts a player fumbling a football.

"Irrelevant Week" gave so much publicity to "Mr. Irrelevant" that in 1979 the Los Angeles Rams, with the penultimate pick, intentionally passed to let the Pittsburgh Steelers, with the last pick, choose first. The Steelers also wanted the publicity and passed as well. The two teams continued to refuse to choose a player until NFL Commissioner Pete Rozelle forced the teams to pick, with the Steelers winning the pick. The incident led to the "Salata Rule", which prohibits teams from passing to get the final pick.

The first Mr. Irrelevant to play in the Super Bowl was Marty Moore, a special teams player drafted last in 1994, who played with the New England Patriots in Super Bowl XXXI.

The first Mr. Irrelevant to make the Pro Bowl was Bill Fischer, who was the last pick in the 1948 NFL Draft. He was drafted by the Chicago Cardinals after his junior season at Notre Dame.  He opted to stay in school, and won the Outland Trophy as the nation's top interior lineman in 1948.  The Cardinals drafted him again in 1949, this time with their first round pick.

The last player chosen in the 1961 NFL Draft, Jacque MacKinnon, had a successful 10-season career. However he signed with the San Diego Chargers of the rival American Football League instead of with the Philadelphia Eagles. He appeared in two AFL All-Star Games in 1966 and 1968.  He was one of only two Mr. Irrelevants to appear in a Pro Bowl or the equivalent.

Prior to the establishment of Mr. Irrelevant, Jimmy Walker was the final pick in the 1967 NFL Draft, despite never having played college football. His main sport, however, was basketball, in which he was a consensus All-American and the nation's leading scorer as a senior at Providence College. Walker was the first pick in the 1967 NBA Draft, and opted for a career in the NBA.

Notable selections 

Since the NFL draft was cut to its current seven-round format in 1994, players presented with this dubious honor have more often succeeded in making the team that drafted them, with some making significant contributions. 

 Tyrone McGriff was perhaps the most successful Mr. Irrelevant from the pre-1994 era. He was drafted by the Pittsburgh Steelers with the last pick of the 12th round in 1980. He made the 1980 NFL All-Rookie Team, and played two more seasons for the Steelers. In 1983, he moved on to the Michigan Panthers of the upstart United States Football League. He won a league championship ring that year, as well as a spot on the USFL All-Star Team.
 John Tuggle started five games as a fullback his rookie year, and was named the 1983 New York Giants Special Teams Player of the Year. However, during the 1984 training camp, he was diagnosed with cancer. He never played again, and died in 1986.
 Marty Moore, a special teams player, became the first Mr. Irrelevant to play in a Super Bowl with the New England Patriots in Super Bowl XXXI and first Mr. Irrelevant to win a Super Bowl with the New England Patriots in Super Bowl XXXVI.
 Mike Green played a significant role in the Chicago Bears secondary in the 2000s, and played from 2000 to 2008.
 Jim Finn was on the roster as a fullback for the New York Giants on their victory in Super Bowl XLII. Prior to the 2007 season, Finn was placed on injured reserve and never played a game for the Giants on their road to the Super Bowl that year, having been replaced by Madison Hedgecock.  He had been the Giants fullback for four seasons.
 Ryan Succop, the 2009 designee, became the starting kicker for the Kansas City Chiefs. He went on to tie the NFL record for highest field goal percentage by a rookie in a season with 86.2 percent, and also passed NFL Hall of Famer Jan Stenerud for most field goals made by a rookie in Chiefs history. Succop was awarded the Mack Lee Hill Award that year. He has been a starting kicker since his rookie season. Succop moved on to the Tennessee Titans for the 2014 season and was signed to a contract extension in early 2018 before being released in March 2020 and signing with the Tampa Bay Buccaneers in early September. He proceeded to win Super Bowl LV with the team, becoming the second Mr. Irrelevant to win an NFL championship, and first to play and win a Super Bowl as a starter and an active player.
 Chad Kelly, the 2017 designee and former Ole Miss quarterback, is the nephew of former Buffalo Bills quarterback and Hall of Famer Jim Kelly. Drafted last largely because injury and discipline questions had lowered his previously high draft stock, Kelly progressed to become the Denver Broncos' second-string quarterback by the 2018 preseason before being released on October 24, 2018. He later signed with the Indianapolis Colts. After moving to the Canadian Football League, Kelly won the 109th Grey Cup in relief of Toronto Argonauts starting quarterback McLeod Bethel-Thompson.
 Brock Purdy, the 2022 designee, became the first Mr. Irrelevant to complete a forward pass in a regular season game, against the Kansas City Chiefs during week seven of the 2022 season. Later that season, in week thirteen, he became the first Mr. Irrelevant to ever throw a touchdown pass in a regular season game in a 3317 win against the Miami Dolphins. The following week he became the first rookie quarterback to beat Tom Brady in his first career start, when the San Francisco 49ers defeated Tampa Bay Buccaneers 35–7 on December 11, passing to Brandon Aiyuk and Christian McCaffrey for touchdowns. He also managed a two yard rushing score, becoming the first Mr. Irrelevant quarterback to do so. Purdy would finish out the season with 4 more wins, thus beginning his career 5–0 and capping off a 10-game winning streak by San Francisco to close out the season. He also became the first Mr. Irrelevant QB to feature in, as well as start and win a playoff game when the 49ers defeated the Seattle Seahawks 41–23 on January 14, 2023, during the Wild Card round, and became the first Mr. Irrelevant QB to make it to the Divisional Round when the 49ers defeated the Dallas Cowboys 19–12 on January 22.

Mr. Irrelevant selections

See also
 List of first overall National Football League Draft picks

Explanatory notes

Citations

External links
 Homepage for "Irrelevant Week" and the current "Mr. Irrelevant"
 "Meeting Mr. Irrelevant" from GQ
 "Guess Mr. Irrelevant contest ends Wednesday", Los Angeles Times (April 22, 2013)—Image of the Lowsman Trophy

Awards established in 1976
Ironic and humorous awards
National Football League Draft
National Football League trophies and awards
Sports in Newport Beach, California